Matter of Time is the first studio album by the band Axium. The album was mixed, mastered, and produced by Mitch Rosenow and features David Cook (vocals, guitar); Bobby Kerr (drums); Jerron Nichols (bass); and Jeff Shrout (guitar).

Track listing

References

External links

2002 debut albums
Axium albums